Three ships of the United States Navy have been named Barney for Commodore Joshua Barney.

  was a torpedo boat in commission from 1901 to 1916 and from 1917 to 1919
  was a Wickes-class destroyer in commission from 1919 to 1922 and from 1930 to 1945
  was a Charles F. Adams-class guided-missile destroyer in commission from 1962 to 1990

See also
, a ferry boat used by the Union Navy during the American Civil War

Sources

United States Navy ship names